Amirabad (also Romanized as Amīrābād) is a village in Shaban Rural District, in the Central District of Nahavand County, Hamadan Province, Iran. At the 2006 census, its population was 431, in 114 families.

References 

Populated places in Nahavand County